The castra of Gilău was a fort in the Roman province of Dacia. Traces of the castra built in the 2nd century AD can be identified at the confluence of the rivers Someșul Mic and Căpuş in the Bánffy Castle's park at Gilău (Romania). The fort and its vicus were both abandoned in the 3rd century.

See also
List of castra

Notes

External links

Roman castra from Romania - Google Maps / Earth

Roman Dacia
Archaeological sites in Romania
Roman legionary fortresses in Romania
Ancient history of Transylvania
Historic monuments in Cluj County